Aparna Dutta Gupta was an Indian scientist and professor. She taught in the Department of Animal Biology, School of Life Sciences, University of Hyderabad. Her research was on zoology, developmental biology and endocrinology. She has carried out research in the field of insect physiology, focusing on pests and their control. Her novel contribution includes that insect fat body expresses hexamerin genes, and the expressed proteins are sequestered by various tissues including male accessory-glands and play a role in reproduction.

Aparna Dutta Gupta, born on 11 th May 1953, obtained her bachelor's, masters, and doctoral degrees from Banaras Hindu University. She has trained a large number of postgraduate students and mentored more than 25 PhD students. She was Fulbright Scholar (1984-1985), Indo-German Exchange Programme Fellow (1991), INSA-Czech Academy Exchange Fellow (2000), DST-DAAD Personal Exchange Fellow (1999–2003), INSA-DFG International Exchange Fellow (2008) and INSA-JSPS Bilateral Exchange Fellow (2012). She is also an elected Fellow of Indian National Science Academy (FNA), Indian Academy of Sciences (FASc), and The National Academy of Sciences (FNASc).

Education
Gupta received her PhD from Banaras Hindu University. She is a fellow of INSA, NASI, and IASc.

Career
She was a Fulbright Scholar & Visiting Scientist, Department of Biology, Marquette University, Milwaukee, USA (1984–1985). She was the Coordinator of the Centre for Biotechnology (2003–2006) and has also served as Head, Department of Animal Sciences (2003–2007) at the University of Hyderabad.

Awards and fellowships
She has received the following fellowships from various international organisations.
 NSA-JSPS Bilateral Exchange Fellow, Miyazaki University, Japan (2012).
 INSA-DFG International Exchange Fellow, Hamburg University, Germany (2008).
 DST-DAAD Exchange Fellow, University of Wuerzberg, Germany (1999–2003).
 INSA Exchange Fellowship, Czech Academy of Sciences, Czech Republic (2000).
 Indo-German Exchange Programme Fellow, University Tübingen, Germany (1991).

Research highlights
She is an outstanding teacher and well-known researcher in the field of insect biology and has served the University of Hyderabad with distinction for more than 35 years. She primarily works on an economically important group of insects which include a large number of stored grain and agricultural pests. Her studies using biochemical and molecular tools have unraveled the developmental and hormonal regulation of various genes, their proteins and the specific physiological processes in insects.  Her research revolves around (i) fat body hexamerin gene expression and their hormonal regulation during the postembryonic development, (ii) membrane receptor mediated sequestration of hexamerins by various tissues and their role in immunity, reproduction, silk secretion and during the metamorphosis, (iii) identification of novel candidates with immune function, (iv) identification and characterization of Bacillus thuringiensis Cry toxin binding receptors in larval midgut and other visceral tissues and (v) deciphering the basis for the development of resistance against Bt toxins in various lepidopteran insects. Her group has identified several candidate genes and their corresponding proteins, which could be exploited either for delivering or targeting molecules and/or growth regulators, which disrupt insect development and reproduction.

Publications 
 Arif, A., Dutta Gupta, A., Scheller, K. (2003) "Tyrosine kinase mediated phosphorylation of the hexamerin receptor in the rice moth Corcyra cephalonica by ecdysteroids."
 Chaitanya R.K., Sridevi P, Senthilkumaran B, Dutta-Gupta, A. (2012)  "Effect of juvenile hormone analog, methoprene on H-fibroin regulation during the last instar larval development of Corcyra cephalonica." Gen. Comp. Endocrinol., doi 10.1016/j.ygcen.2012.08.014.
 Parikipandla Sridevi, R. K. Chaitanya, Aparna Dutta Gupta, Balasubramanian Senthilkumaran (2012) "FTZ-F1 and FOXL2 up-regulate catfish brain aromatase gene transcription by specific binding to the promoter motifs." Biochim. Biophys. Acta, 1819, 57–66.
 Parikipandla Sridevi, Aparna Dutta Gupta, Balasubramanian Senthilkumaran (2011) "Molecular cloning and expression analysis of fushi tarazu factor 1 in brain of airbreathing catfish", Clarias gariepinus. PLoS One 6(12):e28867.
 Madhusudhan Budatha, Thuirei Jacob Ningshen and Aparna Dutta Gupta (2011) "Is hexamerin receptor a GPI anchored protein in Achaea janata (Lepidoptera: Noctuidae)?" J. Biosciences, 36, 545–553.
 Chaitanya RK, Sridevi P, Senthilkumaran B, Dutta Gupta A. (2011) "20-Hydroxyecdysone regulation of H-fibroin gene in the stored grain pest, Corcyra cephalonica, during the last instar larval development". Steroids, 76, 125–134.
 Kirankumar, N., Ismail, S. N., Dutta Gupta, A., (1997) "Uptake of storage protein in the rice moth Corcyra cephalonica: identification of storage protein binding proteins in the fat body cell membranes". Insect Biochemistry and Molecular Biology, Volume 27, Issue 7, Pages 671–679

References 

Indian women biologists
Living people
Academic staff of the University of Hyderabad
Banaras Hindu University alumni
Indian scientific authors
Indian geneticists
20th-century Indian zoologists
20th-century Indian women scientists
1953 births